Tambovsky (masculine), Tambovskaya (feminine), or Tambovskoye (neuter) may refer to:
Tambovsky District, name of several districts in Russia
Tambovsky (rural locality) (Tambovskaya, Tambovskoye), name of several rural localities in Russia
Tambov Oblast (Tambovskaya oblast), a federal subject of Russia